This is a list of college football teams by the number of weeks they have been ranked number one in the AP poll since its inception in 1936 through December 4, 2022.

† No longer a FBS school.
Bold: Team ranked number one in most recent poll.

See also
 List of NCAA college football rankings
 Coaches' Poll
 College football national championships in NCAA Division I FBS
 Mythical national championship

References

AP Poll